High Resolution Imaging Science Experiment is a camera on board the Mars Reconnaissance Orbiter which has been orbiting and studying Mars since 2006. The 65 kg (143 lb), US$40 million instrument was built under the direction of the University of Arizona's Lunar and Planetary Laboratory by Ball Aerospace & Technologies Corp. It consists of a 0.5m (19.7 in) aperture reflecting telescope, the largest so far of any deep space mission, which allows it to take pictures of Mars with resolutions of 0.3m/pixel (1ft/pixel), resolving objects below a meter across.

HiRISE has imaged Mars exploration rovers on the surface, including the Opportunity rover and the ongoing Curiosity mission.

History

In the late 1980s,  of Ball Aerospace & Technologies began planning the kind of high-resolution imaging needed to support sample return and surface exploration of Mars. In early 2001 he teamed up with Alfred McEwen of the University of Arizona to propose such a camera for the Mars Reconnaissance Orbiter (MRO), and NASA formally accepted it November 9, 2001.

Ball Aerospace was given the responsibility to build the camera and they delivered HiRISE to NASA on December 6, 2004 for integration with the rest of the spacecraft.  It was prepared for launch on board the MRO on August 12, 2005, to the cheers of the HiRISE team who were present.

During the cruise phase of MRO, HiRISE took multiple test shots including several of the Moon and the Jewel Box cluster.  These images helped to calibrate the camera and prepare it for taking pictures of Mars.

On March 10, 2006, MRO achieved Martian orbit and primed HiRISE to acquire some initial images of Mars. The instrument had two opportunities to take pictures of Mars (the first was on March 24, 2006) before MRO entered aerobraking, during which time the camera was turned off for six months. It was turned on successfully on September 27, and took its first high-resolution pictures of Mars on September 29.

On October 6, 2006 HiRISE took the first image of Victoria Crater, a site which was also under study by the Opportunity rover.

In February 2007 seven detectors showed signs of degradation, with one IR channel almost completely degraded, and one other showing advanced signs of degradation. The problems seemed to disappear when higher temperatures were used to take pictures with the camera. As of March, the degradation appeared to have stabilized, but the underlying cause remained unknown.  Subsequent experiments with the Engineering Model (EM) at Ball Aerospace provided definitive evidence for the cause: contamination in the analog-to-digital converters (ADCs) which results in flipping bits to create the apparent noise or bad data in the images, combined with design flaws leading to delivery of poor analog waveforms to the ADCs. Further work showed that the degradation can be reversed by heating the ADCs.

On October 3, 2007, HiRISE was turned toward Earth, and took a picture of it and the Moon.  In the full-resolution color image, Earth was 90 pixels across and the Moon was 24 pixels across from a distance of 142 million km.

On May 25, 2008, HiRISE imaged NASA's Mars Phoenix Lander parachuting down to the surface of Mars. It was the first time that one spacecraft imaged the final descent of another spacecraft onto a planetary body.

By 2010, HiRISE had imaged only about one percent of Mars's surface and by 2016 the coverage was around 2.4%. It was designed to capture smaller areas at high resolution—other instruments scan much more area to find things like fresh impact craters. MRO's Context Camera (CTX) captured two fresh impact craters (>130 meter each) formed on Mars in late 2021, the largest discovered by MRO. These seismic events were also detected by Interior Exploration using Seismic Investigations, Geodesy and Heat Transport (InSight). The crater in Amazonis Planitia was discovered independently by both missions, while the crater in Tempe Terra was first observed by Insight and then searched for with CTX images.

On April 1, 2010, NASA released the first images under the HiWish program in which the public suggested places for HiRISE to photograph.  One of the eight locations was Aureum Chaos.  The first image below gives a wide view of the area.  The next two images are from the HiRISE image.

The following three images are among the first images taken under the HiWish program.  The first is a context image from CTX to show where the HiRISE is looking.

Examples of HiRISE images

The following group of images show some significant images taken by the instrument.  Some of these hint at possible sources of water for future colonists.

The following set of pictures show first a full image of a scene and then enlargements from parts of it.  A program called HiView can be used to produce more detailed views.  Some pictures are in color.  HiRISE takes a color strip down the middle only.

Purpose

The HiRISE camera is designed to view surface features of Mars in greater detail than has previously been possible. It has provided a closer look at fresh martian craters, revealing alluvial fans, viscous flow features and ponded regions of pitted materials containing breccia clast. This allows for the study of the age of Martian features, looking for landing sites for future Mars landers, and in general, seeing the Martian surface in far greater detail than has previously been done from orbit. By doing so, it is allowing better studies of Martian channels and valleys, volcanic landforms, possible former lakes and oceans, sand dune fields such as Hagal and Nili Patera, and other surface landforms as they exist on the Martian surface.

The general public is allowed to request sites for the HiRISE camera to capture (see HiWish). For this reason, and due to the unprecedented access of pictures to the general public, shortly after they have been received and processed, the camera has been termed "The People's Camera". The pictures can be viewed online, downloaded, or with the free HiView software.

Design

HiRISE was designed to be a high resolution camera from the beginning. It consists of a large mirror, as well as a large CCD camera. Because of this, it achieves a resolution of 1 microradian, or 0.3 meter at a height of 300 km. (For comparison purposes, satellite images on Google Mars are available to 1 meter.)  It can image in three color bands, 400–600 nm (blue-green or B-G), 550–850 nm (red) and 800–1,000 nm (near infrared or NIR).

HiRISE incorporates a 0.5-meter primary mirror, the largest optical telescope ever sent beyond Earth's orbit.  The mass of the instrument is 64.2 kg.

Red color images are at 20,048 pixels wide (6 km in a 300 km orbit), and blue-green and NIR are at 4,048 pixels wide (1.2 km). These are gathered by 14 CCD sensors, . HiRISE's onboard computer reads out these lines in time with the orbiter's ground speed, meaning the images are potentially unlimited in height. Practically this is limited by the onboard computer's  memory capacity. The nominal maximum size of red images (compressed to 8 bits per pixel) is about 20,000 × 126,000 pixels, or 2520 megapixels and 4,000 × 126,000 pixels (504 megapixels) for the narrower images of the B-G and NIR bands. A single uncompressed image uses up to 28Gbit. However, these images are transmitted compressed, with a typical maximum size of 11.2 gigabits. These images are released to the general public on the HiRISE website via a new format called JPEG 2000.

To facilitate the mapping of potential landing sites, HiRISE can produce stereo pairs of images from which the topography can be measured to an accuracy of 0.25 meter.

Images naming conventions

HiRISE images are available to the public, so it can be useful to know how they are named. This is an excerpt from the official documentation:
 Name:
 ppp_oooooo_tttt_ffff_c.IMG
 ppp = Mission Phase:
 INT = Integration and Testing
 CAL = Calibration Observations
 ATL = ATLO Observations
 KSC = Kennedy Space Center Observations
 SVT = Sequence Verification Test
 LAU = Launch
 CRU = Cruise Observations
 APR = Mars Approach Observations
 AEB = Aerobraking Phase
 TRA = Transition Phase
 PSP = Primary Science Orbit (nov 2006-nov 2008)
 REL = Relay phase
 E01 = 1st Extended Mission Phase if needed
 Exx = Additional extended Missions if needed
 oooooo = MRO orbit number
 tttt = Target code
 ffff Filter/CCD designation:
 RED0-RED9 - Red filter CCDs
 IR10-IR11 – Near-Infrared filter CCDs
 BG12-BG13 – Blue-Green filter CCDs
 c = Channel number of CCD (0 or 1)

The target code refers to the latitudinal
position of the center of the planned
observation relative to the start of orbit.
The start of orbit is located at the equator
on the descending side (night side) of the
orbit. A target code of 0000 refers to the
start of orbit. The target code increases in
value along the orbit track ranging from 0000
to 3595. This convention allows the file name
ordering to be time sequential. The first
three digits refers to the number of whole
degrees from the start of orbit, the fourth
digit refers to the fractional degrees rounded
to the nearest 0.5 degrees. Values greater
than 3595 identify observations as off-Mars or
special observations.

Examples of target code:
 0000 – planned observation at the equator on descending side of orbit.
 0900 – planned observation at the south pole.
 1800 – planned observation at the equator on the ascending side (day side) of the orbit.
 2700 – planned observation at the north pole.

Off-Mars and Special Observations Values:
 4000 – Star Observation
 4001 – Phobos Observation
 4002 – Deimos Observation
 4003 – Special Calibration Observation

Footnotes

See also
Long Range Reconnaissance Imager (Telescope imager on New Horizon probe)

External links

 HiRISE official website
 BeautifulMars Tumblr from HiRISE
 Help NASA categorize images taken by HiRISE
 Browse Map of Images from ASU
 How HiRISE Works - Lesson One: Camera Basics
 How HiRISE Works - Lesson Two: Resolution and Binning
 Multimedia created with HiRISE imagery/data by Seán Doran and Kevin Gill; see also  Seán Doran's Flickr album #1 and #2 and Kevin Gill's Flickr album and a longer YouTube videos by S.D. (Red Planet Rise) and K.G. (Flights of Desolation)

Mars Reconnaissance Orbiter
University of Arizona
Mars imagers